The epiros minnow (Pelasgus thesproticus) is a species of cyprinid fish.

It is found in Albania and north eastern Greece, including the island of Corfu. Its natural habitat is slow flowing rivers and swamps, it is threatened by pollution and water abstraction. It was originally named as Pseudophoxinus stymphalicus thesproticus

References

Pelasgus (fish)
Fauna of Albania
Fauna of Greece
Cyprinid fish of Europe
Taxa named by Alexander I. Stephanidis
Fish described in 1939
Taxonomy articles created by Polbot